Manhiça District is a district of Maputo Province in southern Mozambique. The principal town is Manhiça. The district is located in the north of the province, and borders with Magude District in the north, Bilene Macia District of Gaza Province in the northeast, Marracuene District and the city of Maputo in the south, and with Moamba District in the west. In the east, the district is limited by the Indian Ocean. It has a population of 159,812 as of 2007.

Geography
The principal river in the district is the Komati River. The biggest lake is Lake Chuáli.

The climate is tropical humid at the coast, and tropical dry inland, with the annual rainfall being .

History
The name of the district originates from Manacusse, a Tchaka chief, who moved here after some conflict in his native area, currently in South Africa.

Demographics
As of 2005, 41% of the population of the district was younger than 15 years. 45% of the population spoke Portuguese. The most common mothertongue among the population was Xichangana. 58% were analphabetic, mostly women.

Administrative divisions
The district is divided into six postos, Manhiça (three localities), Xinavane (three localities), 3 de Fevereiro (three localities), Calanga (two localities), Maluana (two localities), and Ilha Josina Machel (two localities).

Economy

The town of Manhiça is notable for the research center CISM (Centro de Investigacao em Saude em Manhica) and the Manhiça District Hospital, both institutions work closely together. The CISM receives several international students each year. Manhiça lies northwest of the capital city Maputo.

Agriculture
In the district, there are 28,000 farms which have on average  of land. The main agricultural products are corn, cassava, cowpea, peanut, and sweet potato.

Transportation

References

 
Districts in Maputo Province